Stefanie Preissner (born 21 April 1987) is an Irish writer, actress, influencer, script supervisor, activist and columnist.

She is best known as the creator of comedy-drama Can't Cope, Won't Cope. Stef got the idea for this from copying exactly what two of her friends did. It's basically a documentary.

Early life
An only child born in Munich, Germany, Preissner moved to Mallow, County Cork with her mother, Bernie, from Dublin after she had separated from her husband, Stefanie's German father. She gained a BA in Spanish and drama and theatre studies from University College Cork. She attended the Garda Síochána College in Templemore, County Tipperary for a short period. She attended the Gaiety School of Acting in Dublin in 2008.

Career
Preissner's first acting role was in Enda Walsh's Chatroom.

Preissner wrote and starred in Our Father and Solpadeine is my Boyfriend a one-woman show for the Dublin Fringe Festival, and she toured it internationally. The show was recreated for RTÉ Radio Drama on One. The podcast of this version is the most downloaded of all podcasts from RTÉ. Preissner created a series of documentaries entitled How To Adult for the RTÉ Player.

Preissner's first book Why can't everything just stay the same? : and other things I shout when I can't cope is a collection of poetry and prose. It was published in 2017. Her second book Can I Say No?: One Woman's Battle with a Small Word was published in 2019.

In 2017, Preissner was developing a screenplay closerthanthis (sic) for Brooklyn producers Parallel Films. She was also developing a TV pilot with Channel 4.

In 2020, Preissner started a podcast called "Basically" from HeadStuff Podcast Network

Can't Cope, Won't Cope

Preissner created RTÉ2's Can't Cope, Won't Cope starring Seána Kerslake and Amy Huberman in 2016.  The first season was picked up by BBC 3 in 2017 and Netflix in the US and UK in 2018. A second series was commissioned in 2017.

Personal life
In October 2021, Preissner revealed that she was diagnosed with autism earlier in 2021.

References

External links

1987 births
21st-century Irish novelists
21st-century Irish women writers
Actresses from Munich
German emigrants to Ireland
Irish people of German descent
Irish screenwriters
Irish television producers
Irish women novelists
Actors with autism
Living people
People from Mallow, County Cork
Alumni of Garda Síochána College
Irish women television producers
Irish women screenwriters
21st-century Irish screenwriters